Epsom railway station is located on the Deniliquin line in Victoria, Australia. It serves the northern Bendigo suburbs of Ascot and Epsom, and it opened on 12 October 2014.

The original Epsom station opened on 19 September 1864 as Epsom and Huntly. It was renamed Epsom Siding on 22 May 1882, and was renamed Epsom on 1 October 1889.<ref  On 26 October 1903, it opened for passengers, and it closed on 16 March 1970, with the platform removed by 24 November of that year.

In April 2014, the Victorian Government announced that a new Epsom station would be constructed. It is serviced six times on weekdays, by extending some services that formerly terminated at Bendigo.

Disused stations Bagshot, Wellsford and Avonmore are located between Epsom and Elmore.

Platforms and services

Epsom has one platform. It is serviced by terminating V/Line Bendigo line services from Southern Cross, and through Echuca line services between Echuca and Southern Cross.

Platform 1:
 services to Southern Cross; terminating services
 services to Southern Cross and Echuca

Transport links

Christian's Bus Company operates two routes via Epsom station, under contract to Public Transport Victoria:
: Huntly – Kangaroo Flat
: to Bendigo station

References

Railway stations in Australia opened in 2014
Regional railway stations in Victoria (Australia)
Transport in Bendigo
Bendigo